The Corsicana Residential Treatment Center or the Corsicana State School was a juvenile correctional facility in Corsicana, Texas. Operated by the Texas Youth Commission (TYC), and later the Texas Juvenile Justice Department (TJJD), it was used for youth with mental illnesses or severe emotional disturbances It closed in 2013. When it was open it had over 200 prisoners.

The TJJD board, in 2016, rejected a plan which would have converted the facility into an immigration detention center for youth; the City of Corsicana had signed an agreement with Cayuga Home for Children to obtain the title for the facility for free, house illegal immigrant minors there, and rent it to Cayuga for a monthly fee of $3,000.

References

Prisons in Texas
Corsicana, Texas
Buildings and structures in Navarro County, Texas
Juvenile detention centers in Texas
2013 disestablishments in Texas
Residential treatment centers